The Irisbus Europolis is an integrally-constructed low-floor midibus model with 49 passengers produced by Irisbus (now known as Iveco Bus.)

Cities whose transport companies use the Irisbus Europolis include Rome, Reggio Calabria, Cagliari and Terni in Italy, Lyon in France, Pula in Croatia, and  Thessaloniki (22 pieces) in Greece.

Europolis
Electric midibuses
Midibuses
Low-floor buses
Low-entry buses
Single-deck buses